Cercosporella rubi (commonly called double blossom or witches' broom) is a plant pathogen which causes rosette disease of blackberry. The disease is particularly prevalent in the southeast of the USA, where it poses one of the largest threats to commercial blackberry production. The disease causes witch's broom symptoms as well as double blossoms, and can severely reduce yield.

References

Fungal plant pathogens and diseases
Small fruit diseases
Mycosphaerellaceae
Fungi described in 1937